Arthur James Beck (8 July 1892 – 28 November 1965) was an Australian politician. Born in Launceston, Tasmania, he was educated at Launceston Grammar School before becoming a boot importer. He sat on Hobart City Council before undertaking military service 1914–1918. In 1940, he was elected to the Australian House of Representatives as the United Australia Party member for Denison, defeating sitting Labor MP Gerald Mahoney. He was defeated in 1943 by Labor candidate Frank Gaha. He turned to a business career and returned to Hobart City Council. Beck died in 1965.

References

United Australia Party members of the Parliament of Australia
Members of the Australian House of Representatives for Denison
Members of the Australian House of Representatives
1892 births
1965 deaths
20th-century Australian politicians